Anas Alam Faizli, known as Anas, one of the most prominent leaders in the COVID-19 vaccination program in Malaysia, is a Malaysian non-political healthcare and pharmaceutical business leader, a construction and an upstream oil and gas professional, a scholar, an activist, and an author. He holds a post graduate doctorate in Business Administration and currently the Chief Executive Officer, Corporate of Duopharma Biotech Berhad. Prior to that he was the Chief Executive Officer of ProtectHealth Corporation Sdn Bhd, a Government Linked Company (GLC), a Director of a Malaysian Multi-National Company (MNC), a leading international heavy steel construction company. Anas formerly was treasurer for the Malaysian Asset and Project Management (MAPMA) and also formerly the assistant honorary aecretary for the Malaysian Oil and Gas Services Council (2016–2018). He is also a certified oil and gas expert by Malaysia's Ministry of Human Resource and an Industrialised Building System (IBS) Professional certified by CIDB Malaysia. Additionally he also co-founded several non-governmental organisations and an economic research think tank. His books are bestseller titled Rich Malaysia, Poor Malaysians, and Malaysia Kaya, Rakyat Miskin.

Family background

Anas was born on 5 December 1980 (Hijri Calendar: 27th of Muharram 1401AH) at the Nether Edge Hospital, Sheffield, England as the first child of ten siblings. He was raised in a family of moderate Muslims. Both his parents are lecturers at the Universiti Teknologi Malaysia (UTM). Anas' mother is from Kedah and his father is from Kuala Lumpur. Anas' maternal grandfather, Abdul Rahman bin Ibrahim was a Headmaster of a government school in Simpang Empat, Alor Setar Kedah.

Anas' paternal grandfather, Mohd Zain bin Abu is of Bugis descent while his paternal grandmother, Siti Hajar binti Othman is of Minangkabau descent. Siti Hajar's father, Haji Othman bin Haji Abdullah, is a nationalist and a freedom fighter, founder of Seruan Azhar of Egypt and also the Malaya newspaper, Majlis. Haji Othman was a close friend of Indonesia's First Vice President, Mohammad Hatta.
 
Haji Othman's grandfather, Haji Mohd Taib bin Haji Abdul Samad, is regarded as an influenced tycoon in the early history of Kuala Lumpur, Malaysia. Haji Taib owned tin mines, plantation land and large numbers of houses and shops mostly in Malay Street (Jalan Melayu), Kuala Lumpur. Haji Taib was a close acquaintance of Sultan Abdul Samad. In the late 19th century, Haji Taib was one of the wealthiest merchants and development centre of city, Kampung Baru.

Education

Anas receives his preliminary education from Sekolah Rendah Islam Al-Amin (SRIAA) which was located in Jalan Gurney, Kuala Lumpur. The school was founded by Pertubuhan Jamaah Islah Malaysia (JIM), now known as Pertubuhan Ikram Malaysia (IKRAM). Anas did his lower secondary school in Sekolah Menengah Islam Al-Amin (SMIAA).

After his Penilaian Menengah Rendah (PMR) result, he was offered and entrance to the Malay College Kuala Kangsar (MCKK) and Sultan Alam Shah Islamic College (Malay: Kolej Islam Sultan Alam Shah – KISAS) which he accepted the latter. In KISAS, Anas was the President of the International Club and in 1997 he represented the school as part of the debating team for the Piala Perdana Menteri (PPM). The School won Central Zone championship by defeating debaters from the Royal Military College (RMC), Sekolah Seri Puteri (SSP), and Sekolah Alam Shah (SAS). KISAS won third place at national level.

After KISAS, Anas pursued his bachelor's degree from the Universiti Teknologi Malaysia. In 2011, he became the pioneer sole graduate with Distinction for Master of Project Management from the Open University Malaysia. In 2015, he again became the pioneer sole graduate for Doctor of Business Administration from the same university.

Anas was chosen as the "valedictorian" graduate and delivered a speech representing 7,506 graduates at OUM's 17th Convocation. In his speech, he urged all the graduates to become the candles that light the way for society, to be a leader for their family, their community, in the workplace and outside, and to make their voice heard.

Career

Anas did his internship with IBM for six months in 2000. He joined the Oil and Gas industry with Sime Sembcorp Engineering and left as Assistant Project Manager in 2004. Anas then spent 15 months with Petronas Carigali Sdn Bhd as a Senior Project Controller. After that, Anas served Talisman Malaysia Limited for 10 years in various project management and developmental Oil and Gas roles in Engineering, Construction, Hookup and Commissioning, Offshore and Installation.

In the ten years, he served two years working onshore Vietnam and two years offshore at the Vietnam-Malaysia border and other assignments. As he is a certified Oil and Gas expert, the media would occasionally get his quote for business related issues on Oil and Gas. After the crude oil price falls in 2014, he joined as Director of a Malaysian Multi-National Company (MNC), a leading international heavy steel construction company in 2015. In 2017, he joined Edgenta PROPEL Berhad (a subsidiary of UEM Edgenta Berhad) as the Operations Head for the maintenance of the ~1,000 km North-South Expressway and led its Public Sector & Industry Engagement activities. In 2020, he joined ProtectHealth Corporation Sdn Bhd as its Chief Executive Officer and established his name as one of the most prominent leaders in the COVID-19 vaccination program in Malaysia in 2021 and 2022. The vaccination program also accelerated the public-private partnership in the healthcare sector being the largest ever government program ever executed in Malaysia. He led the company to a new level, being recognised as leader of public-private partnership in healthcare. He later joined Duopharma Biotech Berhad, Malaysia's no 1 pharmaceutical company as the Chief Executive Officer, Corporate in Oct 2022.

Book – Rich Malaysia, Poor Malaysians

Anas is an occasional contributor for The Edge, The Star, Astro Awani and online portals. In 2014, Gerakbudaya published his best-seller book, entitled Rich Malaysia, Poor Malaysians: Essays on Energy, Economy and Education. A Malay version of the book, Malaysia Kaya, Rakyat Miskin was also published the same year. Both versions was launched by Tengku Razaleigh Hamzah, Malaysia's Former Finance Minister and also the Founding chairman and CEO of Petronas in April 2014.

Tengku Razaleigh Hamzah applauded Anas' intellectual discipline in completing the writing which he describes as demanding mental toughness, tenacity and absolute patience. Policy makers, scholars and corporate figures are of the opinion that the views and ideas presented in the book can be usefully adopted for the formulation of policies by political parties and the government.

On Energy, the book touches on how Petronas plays it roles in its significant contribution to the country. It also explains the history, the regulations and mechanism used and the secret behind Petronas' success.

On economy, the book introduces the Malaysia's inequality dilemma, the myth of the rich and poor, high income nation versus low income citizen, the Malaysia's hollow economy conundrum and addresses issue on the foreign workers, education and healthcare. It also explains the concept of free trade, its pros and cons.

On education, the book advocates revisiting the national education philosophy, the introduction of the Love Pedagogy, promoting reading and critical thinking culture, the introduction of philosophy. It also touches on volunteerism and how the third party can become an agent of democracy.

The book also offers insightful proposals and shares a way out for the problems facing the country.

The book was a bestseller for more than six months at Kinokuniya and Borders and is arguably a tour de force in the local intellectual landscape, as a venue for ideas that bridge policies and the hopes of the people, the responsibility of educators and the potential of their students and more important the problems of the present and the potential of a brighter future.

On 11 May 2017, Tun Arshad Ayub, Father of UiTM and former deputy of Malaysia's Bank Negara launched the new and expanded edition of Rich Malaysia, Poor Malaysians. He was accompanied by Emeritus Professor Tan Sri Anuwar Ali, Former Vice-Chancellor of Open University Malaysia and Universiti Kebangsaan Malaysia, Tan Sri Dato' Ahmad Fuzi Abdul Razak, Secretary-General of the World Islamic Economic Forum and Professor Tan Sri Dr. Ghauth Jasmon, former Vice-Chancellor of Universiti Malaya.

Tun Arshad Ayub highlighted that Malaysia's 60th year of independence is the precise moment that Malaysia is to return to the drawing board. He argued that Anas has initiated the process by bringing forward a multitude of original ideas encompassing energy, economy, and education based on his analysis on the state of the nation and he urged the government, politicians, the civil society, and policy makers to take heed of Anas' powerfully brave book.

The expanded book is an updated version with 13 additional chapters providing a more holistic coverage on fundamental issues that are currently plaguing Malaysia on healthcare, the foreign workers, environment, the hollow economy, green technology, woman empowerment and others.

Think Tank and Non-governmental organisations

Anas is a co-founder of BLINDSPOT, a socio-economic think tank, a group of concerned citizens voicing out the voice of the voiceless – presenting critical, informative data and facts often missed. Anas was formerly a Founding chief executive officer on the board of Teach for The Needs (TFTN), a non-profit education-based civil society organisation which houses 1,000 volunteers, 300 university students and adopts 12 orphanages.

Recognition
Anas is not a celebrity, but is inspirational and is always sharing his thoughts. Anas is definitely an iconic influencer in Malaysia. 

In 2013, Astro Awani named Anas as Top Ten social media influencers. That same year, The Malaysian Insider named Anas through Teach for the Needs (TFTN) as Malaysia's Inspiring People 2013. 

Since the public given him recognition and his risen to fame, Anas has been giving public talks and forum nationwide on various topics and issues while remaining as a non-political industry professional. 

In 2020, Marketing in Asia (MIA) named Anas 100 Most Inspirational Linkedin icons in Malaysia you should follow in 2020. 

In 2021, KSI Strategic Institute for Asia Pacific (KSI) awarded Anas with Asia Pacific Outstanding Business Leader Lifetime Achievement Award and Anas led ProtectHealth to win Outstanding COVID-19 Vaccination Delivery of the Year by GlobalHealth Asia Pacific Awards 2021. 

In 2022, Anas led ProtectHealth at the Healthcare Asia Awards 2022 to be recognised for 2 Awards namely Public-Private Healthcare Partnership of the Year - Malaysia and the Vaccination Delivery of the Year - Malaysia. That same year,  the Malaysia Book of Records (MBoR) recognised ProtectHealth together with the Ministry of Health (MoH) as setting a new Malaysian record in “most vaccination doses administered in a day”.

Honours 
Anas was bestowed with the following honours:

Honours of Malaysia 

  :
  Officer of the Order of the Defender of State (DSPN) – Dato' (2021)

References

External links
 

1980 births
People from Kuala Lumpur
Malaysian businesspeople
Malaysian socialites
Malaysian writers
Malaysian activists
Malaysian Muslims
Malaysian people of Malay descent
Malaysian people of Minangkabau descent
Malaysian people of Bugis descent
Living people